Florencio Sánchez is a small city of the Colonia Department of southwestern Uruguay, on the border with Soriano Department, and is a southern extension of the city Cardona of that department. It is named after the Uruguayan writer and politician Florencio Sánchez and is home to more than 3,700 people.

Geography
The city is located on the junction of Route 2 with Route 12. Route 102 connects it with the city of Rosario, in the south, while the Route 2 leads to Mercedes and Fray Bentos, the capital cities of Soriano and Río Negro, respectively.

History
On 2 October 1929, this populated centre was given the status of "Pueblo" by the Act of Ley Nº 8.482. Until then it had been the head of the judicial section "Puntas de San Juan". Its status was elevated to "Villa" (town) by the Act of Ley Nº 15.540 on 3 May 1984, and finally to "Ciudad" (city) by the Act of Ley Nº 16.725 on 24 November 1995.

Population 
In 2011 Florencio Sánchez had a population of 3,716.
 
Source: Instituto Nacional de Estadística de Uruguay

References

External links 
INE map of Florencio Sánchez and Cardona (Soriano)

Populated places in the Colonia Department

ca:Florencio Sánchez